In certain languages, the final form is a special character used to represent a letter only when it occurs at the end of a word. 
Some languages that use final form characters are: Arabic, Hebrew, Manchu and one letter in Greek.

The lowercase Latin letter "s" had separate medial (ſ) and final (s) in the orthographies of many European languages from the medieval period to the early 19th century; it survived in the German Fraktur script until the 1940s.

Hebrew
In the Hebrew alphabet the final form is called sofit (meaning "final" or "ending").

The now final forms  predate their non-final counterparts; They were the default forms used in any position within a word. Their descender eventually bent forwards when preceding another letter to facilitate writing. A final form of these letters is also called pshuta (meaning extended or plain).

The letter Mem also had a descender , however, its current final form  was a variant of  used interchangeably in all positions. The standardization is mentioned in the Babylonian Talmud (Megillah 2b-3a and Shabbas 104a). One instance of a medial  is preserved in Isaiah 9:6 of the Hebrew Bible, while Nehemiah 2:13 and arguably Genesis 49:19-20 have a final .

Modern Hebrew uses the forms  finally, when transcribing a plosive pronunciation, for example  (microscope),  (Mubarak), while their final forms , are transcribing a fricative pronunciation, for example  (Kach),  (Chef).

References

Writing systems
Orthography
Letters with final form